Institut national de recherche sur les transports et leur sécurité (INRETS) is the former French national institute for transport and safety research. INRETS and the LCPC (the French Central Laboratory of Roads and Bridges) have been merged since January 2011 to form a new research institute: IFSTTAR (the French Institute for Sciences and Technologies of Transport, Planning and Networks).

Research area 

INRETS research roadmap includes the following areas:

Safety of people transportation systems
 Health and road safety (epidemiology, accident, biomechanics, psychology and sociology of human behavior) 
 Public policies on risk 
 Technology and human factors: human-machine cooperation
Innovative transportation systems 
 Mobility of people, lifestyles, territories (analysis of mobility, acceptability and conditions change, networks and regional planning) 
 Goods transportation 
 Traffic management systems and network optimisation methods
Reliability and sustainability of transport systems, optimisation of energy consumption, reduction of environmental impact 
 Safety and efficiency of transport; guided transportation systems 
 Communication, navigation and surveillance, diagnosis and maintenance 
 Evaluation and reduction of emissions of greenhouse gases and pollutants 
 Evaluation and reduction of transport noise - multi-nuisance analysis

Organisation 

The INRETS research institute is organised as a French Scientific and Technical Research Public Establishment and includes the following sites:
 Bron (Lyon) 
 Marne-la-Vallée
 Marseille
 Salon-de-Provence
 Satory 
 Villeneuve-d'Ascq (Lille)

Research cooperations 
 INRETS-Villeneuve-d'Ascq is associated to the research on transportation systems as a member of the PRES Université Lille Nord de France, with research contribution from École centrale de Lille, ENSIAME and University of Valenciennes and Hainaut-Cambresis.
 INRETS-Marne-la-Vallée is associated to research on transportation systems with support from École nationale des ponts et chaussées.

External links
INRETS

University of Lille Nord de France
Research institutes in France
Transport safety organizations
Transport research organizations